St Peter's Church, Radford is a parish church in the Church of England in Radford, Nottingham. Address: 171 Hartley Rd, Nottingham NG7 3DW, UK (St.Peter's Park).

The church is Grade II listed by the Department for Digital, Culture, Media and Sport as it is a building of special architectural or historic interest.

History
The medieval church was demolished and a new church was built in 1812 at a cost of £2,000 by the architect Henry Moses Wood. The chancel was rebuilt in 1871–72 to the designs of the architect Richard Charles Sutton. The contractors for the new work were Richard Stevenson and Field Weston and the new chancel cost £1340. The east window was fitted with stained glass by Heaton, Butler and Bayne representing the crucifixion in memory of the late Mr. J. Sherwin Gregory. The new chancel was consecrated on 25 April 1872 by Rt. Revd. Henry Mackenzie Bishop Suffragan of Nottingham.

Incumbents

Organ
A new two-manual organ by Messrs Bevington and Son  was installed and opened on 21 March 1869 by W.T. Cockrem, organist of St Paul's Church, George Street, Nottingham. There is currently a two manual pipe organ by William Andrews. A specification of the organ can be found on the National Pipe Organ Register

Organists
D.W. Cartwright ca. 1870
Thomas E. Daws
Arthur Richards (formerly organist at St Wilfrid's Church, Wilford, afterwards organist at St. John’s Leenside)
William Henry Hotching 1914 - 1949

Sources

Church of England church buildings in Nottinghamshire
Churches completed in 1812
19th-century Church of England church buildings
Radford
Churches in Nottingham